The two-Higgs-doublet model (2HDM) is an extension of the Standard Model of particle physics. 2HDM models are one of the natural choices for beyond-SM models containing two Higgs doublets instead of just one. There are also models with more than two Higgs doublets, for example three Higgs doublet models etc.

A special case occurs  when , the alignment limit, in which the lighter CP even Higgs boson  has couplings exactly like the SM-Higgs boson. In another limit such limit, where , the heavier CP even boson, i.e.  is SM-like,  leaving  to be the lighter than the discovered Higgs.  

Such a model can be described in terms of six physical parameters: four Higgs masses, the ratio of the two vacuum expectation values and the mixing angle which diagonalizes the mass matrix of the neutral CP even Higgses. The SM uses only 2 parameters: the mass of the Higgs and its vacuum expectation value.

Classification 
Two-Higgs-doublet models can introduce flavor-changing neutral currents which have not been observed so far. The Glashow-Weinberg condition, requiring that each group of fermions (up-type quarks, down-type quarks and charged leptons) couples exactly to one of the two doublets, is sufficient to avoid the prediction of flavor-changing neutral currents.

Depending on which type of fermions couples to which doublet , one can divide two-Higgs-doublet models into the following classes:

By convention,  is the doublet to which up-type quarks couple.

See also 

 Alternatives to the Standard Model Higgs
 Composite Higgs models
 Preon

References

Physics beyond the Standard Model
Hypothetical composite particles